Alexander Alexeyevich Shevchenko (born 3 June 1971) is a Russian wheelchair curler playing as lead for the Russian wheelchair curling team. He and his team won the silver medal at the 2014 Paralympic Games, gold medals at the 2012, 2015, and 2016 World Championships, and the silver medal at the 2017 World Championships

Biography
Shevhcenko came to curling after a car accident.

Awards 
 Medal of the Order "For Merit to the Fatherland" I class (17 March 2014) – for the huge contribution to the development of physical culture and sports, and for the high athletic performances at the 2014 Paralympic Winter Games in Sochi
 Laureate of the "Return to Life" award in 2013

References

External links 

1971 births
Living people
Russian male curlers
Russian wheelchair curlers
Paralympic wheelchair curlers of Russia
Paralympic medalists in wheelchair curling
Paralympic silver medalists for Russia
Wheelchair curlers at the 2014 Winter Paralympics
Wheelchair curlers at the 2018 Winter Paralympics
Medalists at the 2014 Winter Paralympics
World wheelchair curling champions
Russian curling champions
21st-century Russian people